International Police of NAJA is part of Law Enforcement Command of Islamic Republic of Iran in charge of extradition and tasked to cooperate with INTERPOL. Brigadier General Hadi Shirzad is currently head of the department. The department is a National Central Bureau since 28 February 1938.

References 

National Central Bureaus of Interpol
Law enforcement in Iran
Foreign relations of Iran
Law Enforcement Command of Islamic Republic of Iran